Tong Leadership Academy (formerly Tong High School) is a co-educational secondary school and sixth form located in the Tong area of Bradford in West Yorkshire, England.

History
In 2008 Tong High School went through a major remodelling. A new building was built and after vacating, the old building was demolished.

In December 2016, the school converted to academy status, joining Tauheedul Education Trust (now Star Academies), and was renamed Tong Leadership Academy.

Sport teams
Boy's sport teams include those for football, rugby, cricket, swimming, trampolining, badminton and athletics (indoor and cross country).
Girl's sport teams include those for football, netball, rounders, gymnastics, swimming, cheerleading, trampolining, and athletics (indoor and cross country)and yoga

Notable former pupils
Fabian Delph – football player at Manchester City F.C. formerly, Aston Villa, Leeds United and Bradford City
Claire Hardaker – linguist
Zayn Malik – former member of the boy-band One Direction and now a solo artist
Melissa Steel – singer known for Kisses for Breakfast feat Popcaan, and I Loved You by Blonde which she featured on

See also
List of schools in Bradford

References

External links
 

Star Academies
Academies in the City of Bradford
Secondary schools in the City of Bradford